Year One is a 2009 American adventure comedy film directed by Harold Ramis and distributed by Columbia Pictures. The film was written by Harold Ramis, Gene Stupnitsky, and Lee Eisenberg and stars Jack Black and Michael Cera. Its story follows Zed and Oh, two hunter-gatherers who travel to the city of Sodom after being banished from their tribe. Problems quickly emerge during their journey, as they encounter several biblical figures along the way.

The film was produced by Judd Apatow's production company The Apatow Company and was released on June 19, 2009. It grossed $19.6 million in its opening weekend and $62.4 million worldwide, against a budget of $60 million. Upon release, it was panned by critics and audiences, receiving only a 14% approval rating based on 173 votes on Rotten Tomatoes. This marked the last film to be directed, produced, written by and starring Harold Ramis before he died in February 2014.

Plot 
Once informed that the hunter Zed ate from the Tree of Knowledge of Good and Evil, the shaman and Marlak banish him from the tribe. His hut destroyed after Zed burns the village down by accident, the gatherer Oh reluctantly joins Zed on a journey to discover what the world has to offer.

They encounter Cain and Abel. Cain kills Abel with a boulder in an act of rage and tells Zed and Oh that they must escape with him or else he will be accused of killing Abel.

Zed and Oh find out their love interests, Maya and Eema, from their former tribe have been captured and sold into slavery. Trying to buy the girls' freedom, they end up being sold as slaves themselves, as Cain had been wanting to rid himself of the murder's witnesses. Whilst in transport, the slave caravan containing Oh, Zed, Maya, Eema and others from their tribe is attacked and overpowered by Sodomites. Zed and Oh escape and hide in the desert but lose track of the now Sodomite-led slave caravan.

Still resolved to free the slaves and knowing the caravan's new destination, Zed and Oh pass by a mountain where they find Abraham about to kill his son Isaac. Zed stops them, telling Abraham Abraham's Deity sent him to do so. He takes them to his Hebrew village and tells them about the cities of Sodom and Gomorrah.
 
Zed and Oh head off for Sodom when Abraham plans to circumcise them. As they arrive they are captured. Cain, now a Sodomite soldier, saves them from being sodomized, calling them his "brothers". They remind Cain he sold them as slaves; he apologizes and offers them food, gives Zed and Oh a tour of the city and gets them jobs as guards. 
While patrolling the city they see the princess Inanna, who is fasting as she feels guilty that most of the city is starving. She notices Zed and has him invited to a party that night, surreptitiously pulling him aside for clandestine discussion.

Inside the palace, Zed sees Maya and Eema serving as slaves, but Oh is forced to follow the High Priest around the palace while Zed meets with Princess Inanna, who asks him to enter the Holy of Holies and tell her what it is like, believing Zed is the "Chosen One".

Inside the temple, Zed encounters Oh, who is hiding from the high priest. They get into a heated argument and are ratted on by an eavesdropping Cain, who then imprisons them for entering the temple. Sentenced to be stoned to death, Zed convinces the Sodomites to have mercy, so they are instead sentenced to hard labor until they die from work.

The king then announces that he will sacrifice his daughter and two virgins (Maya and Eema), who were labeled by Cain as "followers of the Chosen One", as a gift to the gods. The growing crowd, already at its breaking point from the famine, reacts negatively as Princess Inanna is already very popular for her regular displays of solidarity with the people.

Zed interrupts the ceremony and Oh instigates a riot with the exclamation "The Chosen One Comes"! Abraham arrives with the Hebrews to help overthrow the King. Oh and Eema have sex inside the palace, meaning that Eema cannot be sacrificed. They help Zed subdue the other soldiers, who have already turned on and killed the King.

Together Zed and Oh stop the High Priest from sacrificing Maya. The crowd is ready to proclaim Zed as the Leader being the "Chosen One" but he decides that his love for Oh, Eema, and Maya outstrips his wish to be a Savior persona. He lets Inanna rule, and becomes an explorer with Maya. Oh becomes the leader of his home village. The two say goodbye and head their separate ways.

Cast

 
In addition, the film's director, Harold Ramis, along with Rhoda Griffis, Gabriel Sunday and an uncredited Paul Rudd, complete the family unit of Adam, Eve, Seth and Abel, respectively.

Music
The score to Year One was composed by Theodore Shapiro, who recorded his score with contemporary band elements, and a 75-piece ensemble of the Hollywood Studio Symphony at the Sony Scoring Stage.

Marketing
A commercial for the film aired during Super Bowl XLIII; soon after, a clip from the film surfaced on YouTube and the first trailer was attached to I Love You, Man.

Reception

Critical response
On Rotten Tomatoes, the film has an approval rating of 14% based on 173 reviews, with an average rating of 3.90/10. The site's consensus reads: "Year One is a poorly executed, slapdash comedy in which the talent both in front of and behind the camera never seem to be on the same page." On Metacritic the film has a weighted average score 34% based on 28 reviews. Audiences surveyed by CinemaScore gave the film a grade B− on scale of A to F.

Michael Phillips of the Chicago Tribune gave the film a "fair-good" review of 2.5 out of 4 stars stating that "Year One won't join his list of essential comedies, the ones Ramis helped create as writer, director, performer or combination thereof." Claudia Puig of USA Today gave the film 2 out of 4 stars complaining that the film "is scattershot and silly, squandering its potential by relying on juvenile bawdy humor". Roger Ebert of the Chicago Sun-Times gave the film 1 star out of 4, stating that the film "is a dreary experience, and all the ending accomplishes is to bring it to a close". Kyle Smith of the New York Post gave the film 1.5 stars out of 5 saying it was "mediocre at best."

Box office
Year One opened at #4 at the US box office in its opening weekend. The film eventually grossed $43,337,279 in US ticket sales, and a further $19,020,621 worldwide, for a total of $62,357,900. Its production budget was $60 million.

References

External links

 

2009 films
2009 comedy films
2000s English-language films
2000s adventure comedy films
2000s buddy comedy films
2000s road movies
Apatow Productions films
American adventure comedy films
American buddy comedy films
American fantasy comedy films
American road movies
Columbia Pictures films
Prehistoric people in popular culture
Cultural depictions of Adam and Eve
Films about cavemen
Films directed by Harold Ramis
Films produced by Judd Apatow
Films produced by Harold Ramis
Films produced by Clayton Townsend
Films scored by Theodore Shapiro
Films set in prehistory
Films shot in New Mexico
Films with screenplays by Lee Eisenberg
Films with screenplays by Harold Ramis
Films with screenplays by Gene Stupnitsky
Fiction about neanderthals
2000s American films